Alejo Noe Gelatini (born 7 August 1983) is an Argentine footballer who plays as a midfielder. He is currently a free agent.

Career
Liceo Argentino signed Gelatini to their youth system in 1988, with the midfielder having subsequent stints with Unión de Pérez, Renato Cesarini and Mitre de Pérez. In 2002, Gelatini joined Tiro Federal of Torneo Argentino A. He was part of the club's squad as they rose up to Primera B Nacional in 2002–03 as champions. Torneo Argentino B's 9 de Julio loaned Gelatini in 2004, with a total of two goals in twenty-two fixtures arriving for them. While with 9 de Julio, Tiro Federal were promoted to the Argentine Primera División. He subsequently made thirteen appearances in the top-flight before being released in 2007.

After departing Tiro Federal, Gelatini moved to the Armenian Premier League to play for Gandzasar Kapan. He had limited opportunities there, subsequently leaving to return to his homeland in 2008 with Primera B Metropolitana team Central Córdoba. Nine appearances followed. Gelatini had a spell with regional team Americano Carlos Pellegrini in 2009, prior to securing a move to Vietnam and Hà Nội ACB. He stayed until 2011, initially in V.League 2 before securing promotion to V.League 1. Gelatini then rejoined Americano before spells with Deportivo Roca, Alumni, General Rojo and Cañadense.

Career statistics
.

Honours
Hà Nội ACB
V.League 2: 2010

References

External links

1983 births
Living people
People from Rosario Department
Argentine footballers
Association football midfielders
Argentine expatriate footballers
Expatriate footballers in Armenia
Expatriate footballers in Vietnam
Argentine expatriate sportspeople in Armenia
Argentine expatriate sportspeople in Vietnam
Torneo Argentino A players
Torneo Argentino B players
Primera Nacional players
Argentine Primera División players
Primera B Metropolitana players
V.League 2 players
Tiro Federal footballers
9 de Julio de Rafaela players
FC Gandzasar Kapan players
Central Córdoba de Rosario footballers
Hà Nội FC (1956) players
Deportivo Roca players
Alumni de Villa María players
Sport Club Cañadense players
Sportspeople from Santa Fe Province